Underwater hockey in Great Britain was first played in Southsea, Hampshire where it was invented in 1954. It is governed nationally by the British Octopush Association.

History

Underwater hockey was started in by Alan Blake in 1954. Blake was a founder-member of the then newly formed Southsea Sub-Aqua Club, he and other divers including John Ventham, Jack Willis, and Frank Lilleker first played this game in the Guildhall Baths in Portsmouth. CMAS (the world governing body for underwater hockey) however, still states on its website that the sport originated with the Royal Navy in the same time period.

The first rules were tested in a 1954 two-on-two game and Alan Blake made the following announcement in the November 1954 issue of the British Sub-Aqua Club's then-official magazine Neptune: "Our indoor training programme is getting under way, including wet activities other than in baths, and our new underwater game "Octopush". Of which more later when we have worked out the details".

The first underwater hockey competition was a three-way tournament between teams from Southsea, Bournemouth and Brighton underwater hockey clubs in early 1955. Southsea won, and are still highly ranked at national level today winning 20 out of 52 national championships, which have been played annually since 1969.

Today there are 70 clubs registered with the British Octopush Association (68 British and 2 Irish).

Organisation

Underwater hockey is govererned nationally in Great Britain by the British Octopush Association (BOA) and has been since 1976. They were recognised as the official governing body for the sport a year later by the British Sub-Aqua Club (BSAC), governing body for all sub-aqua sport in the United Kingdom, who also still govern the sport but to a limited extended. In 2013 the BOA affiliated itself to BSAC. The BOA runs the Great Britain national team at all levels and is responsible for major national competitions.

Scotland and Wales
Scotland and Wales have their own governing bodies for underwater hockey, Scottish Underwater Hockey and Underwater Hockey Wales respectively, these organise regional competitions for the respective home nations and also run national teams. However the use of the Scottish and Welsh national teams is limited with the Great Britain side being favoured for the majority of competitions.

Together with Ireland's Comhairle Fo-Thuinn, Scottish Underwater Hockey and Underwater Hockey Wales organise the Cetic Cup for national teams of the three nations. The tournament began in 2022.

Celtic Cup results

Northern Ireland
Underwater hockey in Ireland operates as part of an all-Ireland basis. Therefore, the control in Northern Ireland is that of Comhairle Fo-Thuinn not the BOA.

Demographics
Of the 68 British clubs associated with the BOA, 56 are English, 8 are Scottish, and 4 are Welsh. 10 of the 68 clubs are student clubs, these clubs are associated with the universities of Aberdeen, Bangor, Edinburgh, Lancaster, Liverpool, Oxford, Sterling, Plymouth, York, and Warwick.

National competitions
The BOA operates all major underwater hockey competitions in the UK including National Championships, Nautilus National League, Ladies National Championships, Junior National Championships, and Student Nationals. Other minor underwater hockey competitions also run in the UK, both operated and operated independently of the BOA.

In the UK, the major of club competitions are mixed-sex.

National Championship
The winners of the BOA national championships are:

Nautilus Competition
The Nautilus competition is an annual national mini-league tournament held in the summer. Its current venue is Ponds Forge in Sheffield. Winners are:

Ladies Championship
The winners of the ladies only national championship are:

Veterans Championship
In 2018, the BOA launched the veterans championship for player over 50, winners of the competition are:

Student Nationals
British underwater hockey student national were formalised as a BOA event for the first time in 2020. Previous events were informally organised by participating universities. The first formal BOA student nationals was to be held at the The Alan Higgs Centre in Coventry. Subsequent events have been held at John Charles Centre for Sport in Leeds. Winning university are:

National team
The BOA currently operate elite, masters, under 24s, and under 19s teams for both the men's and women's Great Britain squads. Training camps are usually held across one weekend in odd numbered months.

Medal table
Underwater Hockey World Championships

Underwater Hockey European Championships

Tournaments hosted

Notes

References

Underwater hockey
Sport in the United Kingdom